Añelo is the second category municipality located in the Añelo Department in Neuquén Province, Argentina.

Economy 
The economy of Añelo is based on agriculture. One of the most important crops are grapes as in the near town of San Patricio del Chañar lately the production is dedicated to wine production, a new business in the zone. 
Añelo and the near towns are provided electricity by Cerros Colorados Complex a dam located few kilometers from the town.

Culture 
The Museo del Sitio, a museum that exhibits mapuche tradition, is located near the city.

Populated places in Neuquén Province